Route 431, or Highway 431, may refer to:

Canada
Newfoundland and Labrador Route 431

Hungary
 Main road 431 (Hungary)

India
 National Highway 431 (India)

Israel
Highway 431 (Israel)

Japan
 Japan National Route 431

United States
  U.S. Route 431
 Florida:
  Florida State Road 431
 Florida State Road 431B (former)
 County Road 431 (Seminole County, Florida)
 County Road 431B (Seminole County, Florida)
  Indiana State Road 431 (former)
  Iowa Highway 431 (former)
  Nevada State Route 431
  New York State Route 431
  Puerto Rico Highway 431
  Tennessee State Route 431
 Texas:
  Texas State Highway Loop 431
  Farm to Market Road 431
  Washington State Route 431
  Wyoming Highway 431